Darc Mind is an underground hip hop duo from Queens, New York. It consists of rapper Kev Roc and producer X-Ray.

History
Darc Mind recorded their debut album Symptomatic of a Greater Ill for Loud Records between 1995 and 1997. The duo released the single "Outside Looking In" in 1996. "Visions of a Blur," a track from the album, appeared on the Soul in the Hole soundtrack in 1997. However, Symptomatic of a Greater Ill had never seen the light of day until it was released on Anticon in 2006.

Darc Mind performed the song "Outside Looking In" live on KEXP-FM at Gigantic Studios on October 30, 2006.
In the same year, the duo released Bipolar on Mindbenda Recordings.

Discography

Albums
 Symptomatic of a Greater Ill (Anticon, 2006)
 Bipolar (Mindbenda, 2006)
 What happened to the art? (Mindbenda, 2019)
Darc Mind Wuz Here (Mindbenda, 2022)

EPs
 Soulfood (Mindbenda, 2005)
 Antediluvian Vol. 1 (Mindbenda, 2013)

Singles
 "Outside Looking In" (Loud, 1996)

Compilation appearances
 "Visions of a Blur" on Soul in the Hole (1997)
 "You da One" on Monster Mixes Vol #1 (2007)

References

External links
 Official website

Alternative hip hop groups
American musical duos
Anticon artists
Hip hop duos
Hip hop groups from New York City
Musical groups established in 1995
Musical groups from Queens, New York